Hans Steinlein (1872 in Trier - 1958) was a German sculptor of religious art who, from his studio in Eltville am Rhein, made a number of important altars and other objects for churches in the Saarland area.

Steinlein was born into a family of wheelwrights and in 1886 finished his training in a ceramics shop in Trier. During his journeyman years he worked in Ravensburg, where he broadened his expertise in working with wood and stone as an apprentice, and met the founder of the Beuron Art School, Desiderius Lenz. In the 1890s, he worked with the sculptor Caspar Weis in Frankfurt am Main, and in 1899 he settled as an independent artist in Eltville am Rhein, where he found plenty of work in religious art. He collaborated frequently with the Mainz architect and church builder Ludwig Becker. The ravages of World War II and the iconoclasm of the post-WWII area destroyed much of Steinlein's work.

Two altars in the aisles of St. Martin, Lorch, are from Steinlein's shop.

References

1872 births
1958 deaths
20th-century German sculptors
20th-century German male artists
People from Trier